Bo Wålemark (born 18 August 1964) is a Swedish football manager and former player. In 2011 became the manager of IK Brage.

References

Living people
1964 births
Association football defenders
Swedish footballers
Allsvenskan players
IK Oddevold players
Ljungskile SK players
Swedish football managers
IK Oddevold managers
Ljungskile SK managers
People from Uddevalla Municipality
Sportspeople from Västra Götaland County